North Browning is a census-designated place (CDP) in Glacier County, Montana, United States. The population was 2,408 at the 2010 census.

Geography
North Browning is located at  (48.567499, -113.017871). It is bordered to the south by the town of Browning and is within the bounds of the Blackfeet Indian Reservation.

Demographics

As of the census of 2000, there were 2,200 people, 600 households, and 495 families residing in the CDP. The population density was 744.8 people per square mile (287.9/km2). There were 645 housing units at an average density of 218.4/sq mi (84.4/km2). The racial makeup of the CDP was 4.64% White, 0.05% African American, 93.73% Native American, 0.05% Asian, 0.14% Pacific Islander, and 1.41% from two or more races. Hispanic or Latino of any race were 1.23% of the population.

There were 600 households, out of which 53.3% had children under the age of 18 living with them, 46.3% were married couples living together, 29.5% had a female householder with no husband present, and 17.5% were non-families. 16.2% of all households were made up of individuals, and 3.0% had someone living alone who was 65 years of age or older. The average household size was 3.53 and the average family size was 3.98.

In the CDP, the population was spread out, with 38.7% under the age of 18, 11.2% from 18 to 24, 29.4% from 25 to 44, 16.4% from 45 to 64, and 4.3% who were 65 years of age or older. The median age was 25 years. For every 100 females, there were 99.6 males. For every 100 females age 18 and over, there were 95.4 males.

The median income for a household in the CDP was $24,399, and the median income for a family was $26,071. Males had a median income of $21,094 versus $25,644 for females. The per capita income for the CDP was $8,572. About 27.6% of families and 35.7% of the population were below the poverty line, including 41.4% of those under age 18 and 41.8% of those age 65 or over.

References

Census-designated places in Glacier County, Montana
Census-designated places in Montana